This article lists the confirmed squads for the 2014 Men's Hockey World Cup tournament to be held in The Hague, Netherlands between 31 May and 15 June 2014.

Pool A

Australia
The squad was announced on 28 April 2014.

Head coach: Ric Charlesworth

Belgium
The squad was announced on 24 May 2014.

Head coach: Marc Lammers

England
The squad was announced on 13 May 2014.

Head coach: Bobby Crutchley

India
The squad was announced on 14 May 2014.

Head coach: Terry Walsh

Malaysia
Head coach: Muhammad Dhaarma Raj

Spain
The squad was announced on 18 May 2014.

Head coach: Salvador Indurain

Pool B

Argentina
The squad was announced on 6 May 2014.

Head coach: Carlos Retegui

Germany
The squad was announced on 18 May 2014.

Head coach: Markus Weise

Netherlands
The squad was announced on 13 May 2014.

Head coach: Paul van Ass

New Zealand
The squad was announced on 21 May 2014.

Head coach: Colin Batch

South Africa
The squad was announced on 9 May 2014.

Head coach: Fabian Gregory

South Korea
Head coach: Shin Seok-kyo

References

External links
Official website
Team rosters

Squads
Men's Hockey World Cup squads